Clouds is a 2000 film written and directed by Don Thompson and produced by Will Arntz.

Synopsis
Clouds tells the story of a physicist (Michael Patrick Gaffney) trying to come to terms with the cosmos, and ultimately understanding that love must be a part of any complete description of the universe.

Cast
 Michael Patrick Gaffney as Robert St. John, the physicist.
 Jennifer Jordan Day as Beatrice, his love interest
 Richard Barrows as Tab
 Rob Nilsson as Frank
 Patricia Ann Rubens as Mrs. Martin

Reception
The New York Times reviewer called Clouds "the dumbest intelligent movie I've ever seen," while Film Threat said
 Though Clouds is not a perfect film, the actors make most of the more stilted dialog work, and even the slowest paced moments feature nicely composed visuals from DP Gary Lindsay. By the time we come to the final message “go and love some more” (effectively appropriated from Harold and Maude) it’s apparent that the film is just a good, solid effort with an intriguing plot, and an impressive directorial debut for Thompson.
Despite these mixed reviews, Clouds was awarded the "Feature Film Award" at the 1999 New York International Independent Film and Video Festival and the "Premio Nuovo" at the 1999 Brooklyn International Film Festival.

References

External links
 
 

2000 films
American drama films
2000s English-language films
2000s American films